The Cork Jazz Festival is an annual music festival held in Cork City, Ireland in late October. The first festival began on Friday 27 October 1978, and has been held every year (except in 2020 due to the COVID-19 pandemic).

The festival is Ireland's biggest jazz event and attracts hundreds of musicians and thousands of music fans to the city each year.

Jim Mountjoy founded the festival in October 1978. Mountjoy was a marketing manager of the Metropole Hotel in the city at the time, and, faced with filling his property for the weekend, scheduled the first jazz festival to coincide with the newly instituted October bank holiday.

A small committee was formed and obtained sponsorship from John Player & Sons. The country's first jazz festival successfully attracted thousands of jazz fans. Guinness became the major sponsor in the 1980s.

As festival director between 1978 and 1986, Mountjoy also introduced a Pub Trail, a Jazz Boat (from the UK) and a Jazz Train (from Dublin) to expand the festival. He also travelled to the UK, mainland Europe, Canada and the United States to promote the festival.

Non-jazz artists also play at the festival - for example the 2015 line-up included Gary Numan, The Boomtown Rats, and The Coronas. The inclusion of non-jazz performers prompted some analysts to query whether the "festival has strayed from its roots".

Since the 1990s, average annual festival visitor numbers have exceeded 40,000 - with visitors travelling from many parts of the world. In 2016, over 1,000 musicians from 20 countries were scheduled to perform to more than 40,000 visitors.

As of 2010, over one million jazz fans had visited Cork to hear noted jazz musicians such as: Ella Fitzgerald, George Shearing, Mel Torme, Wynton Marsalis, Buddy Rich, Herbie Hancock, Oscar Peterson, Billy Eckstine, Dizzy Gillespie, Lionel Hampton, Cleo Laine, Dave Brubeck, Chick Corea, Gerry Mulligan, Stéphane Grappelli, Sonny Rollins, Esbjorn Svensson Trio, Al Di Meola, John McLaughlin, Gregory Porter, Billy Cobham, Damon Albarn and others.

References

External links
 Cork Jazz Festival website

Music in Cork (city)
Jazz festivals in Ireland
Tourist attractions in Cork (city)
Music festivals established in 1978
1978 establishments in Ireland